Barrie Harrison Kelly (born 2 August 1940) is a former sprinter from Bury, United Kingdom. He was a member of Bury and Radcliffe Athletic Club.

Athletics career
Between 1965 and 1973 he won 2 gold, 5 silver and 1 bronze medal in the AAA indoor 60 metres/60 yards, missing out on the medals only in 1970. In the 100 yards at the AAA championships, he won a gold, silver, and two bronzes between 1965 and 1968.  His biggest success was in winning the 60 metres at the 1966 European Indoor Games, setting the inaugural world record in the semi-final with 6.6, and equaling this time in the final.

He also competed and two European championships, 1966 in Budapest and 1969 in Athens as well as the Mexico Olympics.

He represented England in the 100 yards and 110 yards relay, at the 1966 British Empire and Commonwealth Games in Kingston, Jamaica.

Personal life
He suffered from asthma and didn't take up athletics till he was 22. He never told the British Amateur Athletic Board of his Asthma, afraid he would miss being selected for the Mexico Olympic Games, and other overseas trips. He went on to represent Great Britain on 33 occasions, which was a record for a sprinter at that time. He also captained the British Men's Team on several occasions.

He had a very successful career in the brewing industry, retiring at the age of 65.

Kelly has always had an interest in photography, and after his retirement, his passion is wildlife. He has a keenness for British wildlife, he has however travelled to many countries, such as Kenya, Botswana, Tanzania, Namibia, India, Canada, the USA, and across Europe.

References

Thiislancashire.co.uk
gbrathletics

1940 births
Living people
Sportspeople from Bury, Greater Manchester
English male sprinters
Athletes (track and field) at the 1968 Summer Olympics
Olympic athletes of Great Britain
Athletes (track and field) at the 1966 British Empire and Commonwealth Games
Commonwealth Games competitors for England